Rodney Ernest Jones (born 23 September 1945) is an English retired professional footballer who played as a goalkeeper.

External links
Rod Jones career stats at the Post-War Players Database

1945 births
Living people
Footballers from Manchester
English footballers
Association football goalkeepers
Rotherham United F.C. players
Burnley F.C. players
Rochdale A.F.C. players
Barrow A.F.C. players
Mossley A.F.C. players
English Football League players